Unreserved is a Canadian radio program, which airs weekly on CBC Radio One. The program is a documentary and interview series which profiles prominent Indigenous people in Canada.

The program debuted in September 2014, as a regional program airing in Manitoba, Saskatchewan, Nunavut, Yukon and the Northwest Territories. It was added to the full national schedule beginning August 30, 2015. Although CBC Radio has aired numerous short-run summer series on Indigenous culture in Canada, including ReVision Quest, New Fire and Trailbreakers, Unreserved is the network's first permanent regular-season series on First Nations issues and culture since The Dead Dog Café Comedy Hour concluded its run in 2000. It was hosted by Rosanna Deerchild from its inception until 2020, and was then taken over by Falen Johnson.

Figures profiled on the series to date have included Murray Porter, Tantoo Cardinal, Nathaniel Arcand, Perry Bellegarde, Don Amero, Christa Couture, Paul Seesequasis and Candy Palmater.

See also 
 List of Native American podcasts

References

External links

CBC Radio One programs
2014 radio programme debuts
First Nations radio programs
Canadian talk radio programs

Native American podcasts